The women's dual was an event at the annual UCI Mountain Bike & Trials World Championships. It was held between 2000 and 2001, being replaced by the four-cross event in 2002. Anne-Caroline Chausson of France was the most successful rider with two gold medals.

Medalists

References
Results from the Union Cycliste Internationale's website.

Events at the UCI Mountain Bike & Trials World Championships